Obârșia-Cloșani is a commune located in Mehedinți County, Oltenia, Romania. It is composed of two villages, Godeanu and Obârșia-Cloșani.

References

Communes in Mehedinți County
Localities in Oltenia